The General Union for Development of Macau is a political party in the Chinese Special Administrative Region of Macau.

See also
 Politics of Macau

Political parties in Macau